The MV Murree was a 1981 ship of the SD18 type, which sank in the English Channel in 1989.

Development
The SD14 (Shelter Deck 14) type was the successor class of Liberty Ships developed by the Austin & Pickersgill's shipyard on the River Wear in Sunderland. 211 SD14 vessels were built. The MV Murree was one of three SD18 vessels - a larger and more advanced type based on the SD14 - built at Austin & Pickersgill's Southwick yard. While the shipyard is closed today, the company line is now a member of the A&P Group.

Career
Her working life was spent exclusively with the Pakistan National Shipping Corporation. The name Murree connected the ship with an important Pakistani hill station.

Sinking
The MV Murree sank in a force 10 storm 22 miles south east of Start Point on 28 October 1989 after deck containers were dislodged and damaged the hull. Royal Navy search and rescue Sea King helicopters, of 771 Naval Air Squadron and 772 Naval Air Squadron flying from RNAS Culdrose and RNAS Portland near Helston Cornwall and Portland Dorset respectively, made a brave and difficult rescue of the 40 crew and passengers.  Film of the rescue appeared in the BBC television series 999. The subject was covered again by the BBC in 2013 in a John Sergeant documentary about the Westland Sea King Helicopter.

The wreck has subsequently become an attraction for sport divers.

References

External links
 SD14 General Cargo Ship - a Model
 The Wreck of the Murree
 Wreck Tour: 16, The Murree - Divernet
 MV Murree entry at UK Diving
 Wikimapia entry
 Tyne & Wear County Council Museum Service Information Sheet The SD14 story. SD is Shelter Deck. Published in about 1976/77 and uploaded with the permission of Tyne & Wear Archives & Museums service. The original item is at the Discovery Museum, Newcastle upon Tyne. Reference is to page 1. Pages 2/3 are uploaded beside it.

1981 ships
Shipwrecks of England
Shipwrecks in the English Channel
Ships built on the River Wear
Ships of Pakistan
Maritime incidents in 1989
Ships sunk with no fatalities